Bruce House may refer to:

Blanche K. Bruce House, a historic house in Washington, D.C.
Donald Bruce House, a historic plantation in South Carolina
H. L. Bruce House, a historic house in Tennessee